South Carolina Highway 7 (SC 7) is a  state highway in the east-central part of the U.S. state of South Carolina. The route connects the West Ashley part of the city of Charleston with North Charleston.

Route description
SC 7 begins at an intersection with U.S. Route 17 (US 17; Savannah Highway) in West Ashley. Here, it also has an interchange with Interstate 526 (I-526). It heads east-northeast to an intersection with SC 61. A little while later, it meets the northern terminus of SC 171. Then, the highway crosses over the Ashley River. On the east side of the river, SC 7 enters North Charleston. Almost immediately is an interchange with I-26. About  later, it meets its northern terminus, an intersection with US 52/US 78 (Rivers Avenue).

Major intersections

See also

References

External links

SC 7 - South Carolina Hwy Index

007
Transportation in Charleston, South Carolina
Transportation in North Charleston, South Carolina